Sounds True is a multimedia publishing company founded in 1985 by Tami Simon. The company is based in Louisville, Colorado, near Boulder, Colorado. The company publishes over 800 spoken-word audio and music recordings, books, multimedia learning resources, and online educational programs from those prominent in the fields of spirituality, psychology, health, and healing, including NY-Times bestselling authors Michael A. Singer, Eckhart Tolle, Pema Chödrön, Geneen Roth, Jon Kabat-Zinn, Clarissa Pinkola Estés, Andrew Weil, Brené Brown, and Caroline Myss. The company organizes and hosts an annual event, dedicated to personal growth and spiritual transformation, called The Wake Up Festival, in August of each year, in Estes Park, Colorado.

The company was listed in Inc. magazine's 1995 and 1996 lists of fastest-growing, privately held companies.

Spoken word
The company was started in 1985 by Tami Simon, with a tape recorder and a small studio in Boulder, Colorado. Sounds True has released spoken word recordings of original works by writers and lecturers Andrew Weil, Pema Chödrön, Jon Kabat-Zinn, Jack Kornfield, Clarissa Pinkola Estés, Eckhart Tolle, A. H. Almaas, Reginald Ray, Tsultrim Allione, Margot Anand, Coleman Barks, Stephen Batchelor, Tara Brach, the Dalai Lama, Michael Lerner, Deepak Chopra, Lama Surya Das, Ram Dass, Georg Feuerstein, Matthew Fox, Joseph Goldstein, Daniel Goleman, Stanislav Grof and Caroline Myss. In 1990, their release of Clarissa Pinkola Estés' Women Who Run with Wolves: Myths and Stories of the Wild Woman Archetype audiotape led to the Ballantine Books publication of her book by the same name. Martha Beck's CD Follow Your North Star was released by Sounds True.

Music
Sounds True produces music CDs and digital music files of spiritual and meditative music. Artists include Krishna Das, Jai Uttal, Nawang Khechog, Shri Anandi Ma, Savina Yannatou, Alessandra Belloni, Marjorie de Muynck, and El-Funoun. Sounds True albums have been featured on National Public Radio. In 2010, Sounds True entered a licensing partnership with The Relaxation Company.  Sounds True began distributing and marketing The Relaxation Company's products as of April 1, 2010.

Books
In 2005, Sounds True began publishing books, among them David Deida's The Way of the Superior Man and The Rational Psychic by Jack Rourke. It has published 80 books and book/audio CD packages.

References

American independent record labels
Book publishing companies based in Colorado
Companies based in Boulder, Colorado
New-age music record labels
Publishing companies established in 1985
Spoken word record labels
World music record labels
1985 establishments in Colorado